The 66th Infantry Division (Hanja: 第六十六步兵師團) is a military formation of the Republic of Korea Reserve Forces and Republic of Korea Army. The division is subordinated to the Mobilization Force Command and is headquartered in Gapyeong County, Gyeonggi Province and was created on 1 March 1982. During the peacetime, they are in charge of recruit training and active as a second line military unit.

Organization
Headquarters:
Headquarters Battalion
Reconnaissance Battalion
Engineer Battalion
Armor Battalion
Chemical Company		
Signal Battalion
Support Battalion
Medical Battalion
187th Infantry Brigade
188th Infantry Brigade
189th Infantry Brigade
Artillery Brigade
3 Artillery Battalions

References

InfDiv0066
InfDiv0066SK
Military units and formations established in 1982
Gapyeong County